The 2018 AFC Futsal Championship was the 15th edition of the AFC Futsal Championship, the biennial international futsal championship organised by the Asian Football Confederation (AFC) for the men's national teams of Asia. The AFC appointed Taipei and New Taipei City, Taiwan (designated as Chinese Taipei by FIFA) as hosts on 29 July 2017; the tournament took place between 1 and 11 February 2018 at Xinzhuang Gymnasium and University of Taipei Gymnasium. A total of 16 teams played in the tournament.

Defending champions Iran defeated Japan in the final to win their 12th title.

Qualification

Qualifying was played on 15 October – 12 November 2017.

Qualified teams
The following 16 teams qualified for the final tournament.

Venues
The competition was played in two venues in two cities.

Draw
The final draw was held on 12 December 2017, 11:00 TWT (UTC+8), at the Sherwood Taipei in Taipei. The 16 teams were drawn into four groups of four teams. The teams were seeded according to their performance in the 2016 AFC Futsal Championship final tournament and qualification, with the hosts Chinese Taipei automatically seeded and assigned to Position A1 in the draw.

Squads

Each team must register a squad of 14 players, minimum two of whom must be goalkeepers (Regulations Articles 29.4 and 29.5).

Match officials
The following referees were chosen for the 2018 AFC Futsal Championship.

Referees

  Darius Turner
  Hussain Ali Al-Bahhar
  An Ran
  Liu Jianqiao
  Lee Po-fu
  Mahmoudreza Nasirloo
  Hasan Mousa Al-Gburi
  Tomohiro Kozaki
  Kim Jong-hee
  Nurdin Bukuev
  Mohamad Chami
  Helday Idang
  Rey Ritaga
  Yuttakon Maiket
  Azat Hajypolatov
  Fahad Al-Hosani
  Anatoliy Rubakov
  Trương Quốc Dũng

Group stage
The top two teams of each group advance to the quarter-finals.

Tiebreakers
Teams are ranked according to points (3 points for a win, 1 point for a draw, 0 points for a loss), and if tied on points, the following tiebreaking criteria are applied, in the order given, to determine the rankings (Regulations Article 11.5):
 Points in head-to-head matches among tied teams;
 Goal difference in head-to-head matches among tied teams;
 Goals scored in head-to-head matches among tied teams;
 If more than two teams are tied, and after applying all head-to-head criteria above, a subset of teams are still tied, all head-to-head criteria above are reapplied exclusively to this subset of teams;
 Goal difference in all group matches;
 Goals scored in all group matches;
 Penalty shoot-out if only two teams are tied and they met in the last round of the group;
 Disciplinary points (yellow card = 1 point, red card as a result of two yellow cards = 3 points, direct red card = 3 points, yellow card followed by direct red card = 4 points);
 Drawing of lots.

All times are local, TWT (UTC+8).

Group A

Group B

Group C

Group D

Knockout stage
In the knockout stage, extra time and penalty shoot-out are used to decide the winner if necessary, except for the third place match where penalty shoot-out (no extra time) is used to decide the winner if necessary (Regulations Article 15.1).

Bracket

Quarter-finals

Semi-finals

Third place match

Final

Awards
The following awards were given at the conclusion of the tournament:

Goalscorers

Tournament team rankings

See also
 List of sporting events in Taiwan

References

External links
, the-AFC.com
AFC Futsal Championship 2018, stats.the-AFC.com

 
2018
Championship
AFC
International futsal competitions hosted by Taiwan
February 2018 sports events in Asia